Hardening is the process by which something becomes harder or is made harder.

Hardening may refer to:

 Hardening (metallurgy), a process used to increase the hardness of a metal
 Hardening (botany) or cold hardening, a process in which a plant undergoes physiological changes to mitigate damage from cold temperatures
 Hardening (computing), the process of securing a system against attack
 Target hardening, strengthening of the security of a building or installation to protect it from attack
 Sclerotization, a biochemical process forming cuticle in arthropods

See also
 
 Harden (disambiguation)
 Hardness, a measure of resistance to deformation